Aşağıçatma is a village in the District of Serik, Antalya Province, Turkey.

References

Villages in Serik District